Deep Creek Dam is a major ungated concrete gravity dam across the Deep Creek in the Snowy Mountains of New South Wales, Australia. The dam's main purpose is for the diversion of water for generation of hydro-power and is the smallest of the sixteen major dams that comprise the Snowy Mountains Scheme, a vast hydroelectricity and irrigation complex constructed in south-east Australia between 1949 and 1974 and now run by Snowy Hydro.

The impounded reservoir is called the Deep Creek Reservoir.

Location and features
Completed in 1961, Deep Creek Dam is a major dam, located within the Snowy Valleys local government area. The dam was constructed based on engineering plans developed under contract by the Snowy Mountains Hydroelectric Authority.

At 100% capacity the dam wall holds back  of water. The uncontrolled spillway is capable of discharging .

The water behind the dam is diverted into the Tooma – Tumut Tunnel through a siphon intake along with 3 other intakes on the Tunnel to Tumut Pond Reservoir, for use in the Tumut Valley Power Stations.Below the dam wall, Deep Creek flows into the Tooma River, before emptying into the Murray River within the Murray–Darling basin.

See also

 Kosciuszko National Park
 List of dams and reservoirs in New South Wales
 Snowy Hydro Limited
 Snowy Mountains Scheme
 Snowy Scheme Museum

References

External links
 

Snowy Mountains Scheme
Gravity dams
Dams in New South Wales
Dams completed in 1961
Kosciuszko National Park
Murray-Darling basin